The Old Palace in the city of York, North Yorkshire, England, is also known as the Minster Library and is in Dean's Park. It houses York Minster’s library and archives as well as the Collections Department and conservation studio. Its name is a new one and renders homage to the part of the building that used to be the chapel of the Archbishop of York, which was built in the 13th century.

History
On 29 March 1628 the Archbishop of York Tobias Matthew died and he left his fortune not to his sons or the church but to his wife Frances Matthew. Amongst his possessions was a large collections of books that were said to be the "largest private collection in England". There were 600 books and they were valued then at £300 and Frances decided to give all of these to York Minster. These books are the basis of the library and it was said that her gift deserved 'to live as long as the church itself'. Frances had been married for fifty years and she died the year after making the gift.

This building was refurbished in 1810 and shortly thereafter became the home of the Minster library. Notable items held in the collection include cathedral records dating to back to 1150 and a copy of the 1631 Wicked Bible. It is a Grade I listed building.  An extension was added in 1998.

References

External links

 Treasures and Collections: Library, York Minster website
 About the York Minster Library University of York website

Cathedral libraries
Grade I listed buildings in York
Libraries in North Yorkshire
Archives in North Yorkshire
Episcopal palaces in England
York Minster